The 7.62 cm FlaK L/30 was a German 76.2 mm anti-aircraft gun produced by Krupp during the First World War.

History
The origins of the 7.62 cm FlaK L/30 go back to the Russian 76 mm divisional gun M1902 field gun which was captured in large numbers during the first two years of World War I.  A combination of factors led the Germans to issue M1902's to their troops as replacements.

These included:
 An underestimation of light field artillery losses during the first two years of the war and an inadequate number of replacement guns being produced.
 An underestimation of ammunition consumption, inadequate production capacity, and resulting shortages.
 The superior ballistic performance of the M1902 compared to German designs.

Once adequate numbers of new field guns such as the 7.7 cm FK 16 were being produced obsolete types such as the 9 cm Kanone C/73 and captured guns such as the M1902 and Canon de 75 modèle 1897 were withdrawn from front-line service and issued to anti-aircraft units.  At first, all of the combatants employed field guns on improvised anti-aircraft mounts, which were typically earthen embankments or scaffolds to get the muzzle pointed skyward.  Later in the war, specialized anti-aircraft mounts were developed.

Design   
The 7.62 cm FlaK L/30 was a conversion of captured M1902's that were placed on high-angle mounts for the anti-aircraft role.  Unlike the 7.7 cm FlaK L/35, which was bored out to fire German ammunition the 7.62 cm FlaK L/30 could fire Russian or German made ammunition.  The reason why the M1902 was not converted was that the steel it was made from was brittle and didn't take well to reboring.  The conversion was mainly focused on modifying the M1902's carriage to accommodate a pedestal mount which allowed up to 70° of elevation and a travel lock on the recoil mechanism.  In the field, the guns were anchored to a firing ring to allow 360° of traverse.  At least 120 guns were converted by Krupp during World War I.

Photo Gallery

References

76 mm artillery
Anti-aircraft guns of Germany
World War I anti-aircraft guns